Swanesang ("Swan song") is the second full-length album by South African punk rock band Fokofpolisiekar. It was released in 2006 by Rhythm Records and is 45:33 minutes long. It is not as heavy as previous albums and contains more melodic and alternative sounds. It includes the song Brand Suid-Afrika, which was previously released on their Brand Suid-Afrika EP.

Track listing

External links 
Official Fokofpolisiekar website

2006 albums
Fokofpolisiekar albums